Miami Township is an inactive township in Saline County, in the U.S. state of Missouri.

Miami Township was erected in 1822, taking its name from the community of Miami, Missouri.

References

Townships in Missouri
Townships in Saline County, Missouri